Amphicerus bicaudatus, known generally as the apple twig borer or grape cane borer, is a species of horned powder-post beetle in the family Bostrichidae.

Population dynamics 
Allen et al., 1991 finds some periodicity and some chaos in its population dynamics while Allen et al., 1993 finds only periodicity and quasiperiodicity. Both examine the interaction of beetle, insecticide, cane removal, and the grapevine host. The 1991 model shows some chaotic solutions while 1993 never does.

References

Further reading

External links 
 

Bostrichidae
Beetles described in 1824
Articles created by Qbugbot